Count Frans David Alopaeus  (also Alopeus) (December 19, 1769 in Vyborg – June 13, 1831 in Berlin) was an Imperial Russian diplomat.

Biography 
Born into the Finnish noble Alopaeus family, he followed his older brother Maximilian von Alopaeus into a diplomatic career. He was enrolled at the Military Academy in Stuttgart from 1781 to 1785. He studied at the Georg-August-Universität in Göttingen. He was the Imperial Russian ambassador to Stockholm from 1803, and took part in the negotiations for the Peace of Fredrickshamn in 1809. He was granted a title of Count along with the coat of arms in 1820 in Congress Poland for his negotiations on Congress Poland's borders with Kingdom of Prussia.

References 
 Frans David Alopaeus

1769 births
1831 deaths
Diplomats from Vyborg
University of Göttingen alumni
Ambassadors of Russia to Sweden
Counts of Poland
Finnish expatriates in Sweden
Finnish people from the Russian Empire